Beverley Nicholson (born 4 June 1975) is an English former cricketer who played as an all-rounder. She was a right-handed batter and right-arm medium bowler. She appeared in six One Day Internationals (ODIs) for England, making her debut against New Zealand in June 1996. She was included in England's 1997 Women's Cricket World Cup squad, playing in two matches. Overall she scored 53 runs at an average of 17.66 in her six ODIs. She played county cricket for Yorkshire.

References

External links
 
 

1975 births
Living people
Cricketers from Doncaster
England women One Day International cricketers
Yorkshire women cricketers